"True" is a song from American alternative rock band Concrete Blonde, which was released in 1987 as the second single from their debut studio album Concrete Blonde (1986). The song was written by Johnette Napolitano and James Mankey, and produced by Earle Mankey and Concrete Blonde. The song reached number 42 on the US Billboard Album Rock Tracks chart.

Music video
The song's music video was directed by Jane Simpson and produced by Tina Silvey for Silvey-Lee Productions. It achieved medium rotation on MTV.

Critical reception
On its release, Cash Box wrote, "Somewhere between Suzanne Vega and Chrissie Hynde, Concrete Blonde's Napolitano has delivered one of the most compelling, searing performances of 1987 here. Like the name suggests, there is something tender, something tough to this group." Billboard described "True" as a "tasty neo-Velvets tidbit, with Napolitano landing somewhere between Nico and Chrissie Hynde."

In the UK, Len Brown of New Musical Express described "True" as being "as vulnerable as Velvet" and noted the contrast to its "as tough as a Tonka truck" B-side "Still in Hollywood". Brown added that the band were "blessed with the low (Mc)Kee vocals" of Napolitano. Paul Massey of the Aberdeen Evening Express described Concrete Blonde as a "promising Los Angeles trio" with "True" being a "cool, mid-tempo rock ballad distinctive for Napolitano's fragile, edgy vocals".

Formats

Personnel
Credits are adapted from the Australian and European 7-inch and UK 12-inch sleeve notes.

Concrete Blonde
 Johnette Napolitano – vocals, bass
 James Mankey – guitars
 Harry Rushakoff – drums

Production
 Earle Mankey, Concrete Blonde – producers

Charts

References

1986 songs
1987 singles
Concrete Blonde songs
Songs written by Johnette Napolitano
I.R.S. Records singles